Labour Inspectorates (Non-Metropolitan Territories) Convention, 1947 is  an International Labour Organization Convention.

It was established in 1947 with the preamble stating:
Having decided upon the adoption of certain proposals concerning labour inspectorates in non-metropolitan territories,...

Ratifications
As of 2013, the convention has been ratified by 11 states. One state—Australia—has subsequently denounced the convention. It is in force in Tanzania based on the ratification of Zanzibar, which took place two days before Zanzibar merged with Tanganyika to form Tanzania.

External links 
Text.
Ratifications.

International Labour Organization conventions
Treaties concluded in 1947
Treaties entered into force in 1955
Treaties of Belgium
Treaties of the Republic of Dahomey
Treaties of Fiji
Treaties of the French Fourth Republic
Treaties of Papua New Guinea
Treaties of the Somali Republic
Treaties of the Sultanate of Zanzibar
Treaties of Togo
Treaties of Trinidad and Tobago
Treaties of the United Kingdom
1947 in labor relations